is Station A-12 on the Toei Asakusa Line of the Tokyo Subway network in Japan. It is located underground in the Kyōbashi neighborhood of Chūō, Tokyo.

Station layout
Takaracho Station has two side platforms serving the line's two tracks.

Platforms

History
Takaracho Station opened on February 28, 1963, on what was then called Line 1. The line took its present name in 1978. The station takes its name from Takaracho, a neighborhood that was named in 1931. The neighborhood's name disappeared in 1978 when Takaracho merged with neighboring Kyōbashi, but the station continues to use the old name.

Surrounding area
 Kyōbashi Station ( Tokyo Metro Ginza Line)
 Hatchōbori Station (  Keiyō Line and   Tokyo Metro Hibiya Line)

Railway stations in Japan opened in 1963
Toei Asakusa Line
Stations of Tokyo Metropolitan Bureau of Transportation
Railway stations in Tokyo